KWS SAAT SE & Co. KGaA  (ISIN: DE0007074007) is a European independent and family-owned company based in Germany that focuses on plant breeding, with activities in about 70 countries. KWS is the fourth largest seed producer worldwide based on sales in agricultural crops. The product range includes seed varieties for sugar beet, corn, cereals, oil and protein plants, sorghum, catch crops ans vegetables. The capital letters "K," "W" and "S" in the name KWS stand for Klein Wanzlebener Saatzucht, which means seed breeding from Klein Wanzleben. The company's original headquarters were in Klein Wanzleben, an East German town located near the city of Magdeburg. Its main markets are in Europe, North and South America as well as Asia. KWS has breeding and distribution activities in more than 70 countries. In 1954, the company went public on the Hamburg-Hannover Stock Exchange and has been on the SDAX list of the Frankfurt Stock Exchange since June 2006. In addition, the shares are listed in the Nisax20 index of shares in Lower Saxony.

History
In 1838 the Kleinwanzleben Zuckerfabrik (Kleinwanzleben Sugar Refinery) was founded as a stock company. In 1856 the majority of its shares were acquired by the sugar beet grower and farmer Matthias Christian Rabbethge, one of the pioneers of the German sugar industry. In the same year he and his then future son-in-law Julius Giesecke founded a general commercial partnership (OHG). In 1885 the Rabbethge & Giesecke OHG became a joint stock company (Aktiengesellschaft) under the name Zuckerfabrik Klein Wanzleben formerly Rabbethge & Giesecke Aktiengesellschaft (AG). In 1937 it was changed into Rabbethge & Giesecke AG because the Reichsnährstand did not want any anonymous investors in the agriculture and forestry sector. After the Second World War the company was relocated to the Lower Saxonian city of Einbeck which has been its headquarters since then. In 1946 a rescue company was established under the name Rabbethge & Giesecke Saatzucht GmbH. The foundation of this rescue company was necessary in order to continue the Western activities of the original joint stock company, which was still based in Klein Wanzleben. In 1951 the two companies were merged and took the title Kleinwanzlebener Saatzucht formerly Rabbethge & Giesecke AG. In 1975 it was changed into KWS Kleinwanzlebener Saatzucht formerly Rabbethge & Giesecke and then finally reduced to KWS SAAT AG in 1999.In spring 2015, KWS SAAT AG was renamed the European stock corporation KWS SAAT SE. At the beginning of July 2019, KWS completed a transformation of its legal form into KWS SAAT SE & Co. KGaA. The first international branch of KWS was established in 1900 in the Ukrainian town Vinnytsia to meet the demand of sugar beet farmers in Russia. In 1920 the company began to expand its business into corn, fodder beet and potato breeding. Following the relocation to Einbeck, KWS focused on the breeding of sugar beet, corn, rapeseed, sunflower, cereals and potatoes. In the years directly after the war, the company became an important supplier to the West German sugar beet industry. Since 1963 it has established subsidiaries in Europe, North and South America, Asia and North Africa.

Expansion and acquisitions
In the 1950s the company began intensifying its business in Western and South European countries. At the same time it also started to expand its activities in the US sugar beet market. In 1956 KWS acquired the company Segenta in Chile and Pan Tohum Islah ve Üretme A.S. in Turkey. In 1967/68 it began merging its cereal breeding activities with the companies Heine-Peragis and Lochow-Petkus GmbH. In 2008, KWS acquired Lochow-Petkus GmbH which was subsequently renamed KWS LOCHOW GMBH.
In 1968 KWS collaborated with the American plant breeder Northrup King Company to found the company Betaseed. In 1978 it founded KWS Seeds Inc. to manage all business activities in North America. In the 1990s the company acquired the Argentinean breeding company Trebol Sur which was then renamed KWS Argentina in 1997.

In 2000 the French plant breeding group Limagrain and KWS decided to merge their corn business in North America and formed the joint venture AgReliant. In 2003 KWS founded KWS Türk in Turkey to enhance the distribution of seeds in North Africa (Morocco, Tunisia, Libya and Egypt) and Middle Eastern countries including Iran, Iraq and Lebanon. In 2008 KWS and the Dutch Van Rijn Group established a joint venture in breeding potato seeds and in April 2011 KWS acquired the remaining interests in Van Rijn and formed the subsidiary KWS POTATO B.V. In September 2011 it founded a joint venture with the Chinese company Kenfeng to manage the production and distribution of corn seed in China. In October 2011 KWS and the French seed producer Vilmorin formed a research collaboration as a 50/50 joint venture company to develop GM corn traits.

In June 2012 KWS acquired the Brazilian companies SEMÍLIA and DELTA that are located in Paraná and run four breeding stations in Brazil. On 1 July 2012 both companies merged to form KWS BRASIL PESQUISA & SEMENTES LTDA. As of 1 July 2012, KWS acquired a majority shareholder position in the company RIBER whose name was then changed to RIBER – KWS SEMENTES S.A. This company, situated in the Brazilian state Minas Gerais, will continue its focus on the Brazilian market through offering GM corn hybrids and soybean varieties.
In 2018, KWS announced that they will close all the Service Centers located in different parts of the world (Barcelona, Vienna, Einbeck, São Paulo) to Berlin as part of the owner's family decision. These movements will be done during the next 3 years within the ONEGLOBE project and Barcelona Service Center was the first movement that will shut down the operations in June 2019. Projects were launched to organize the transfer of activities and the next step will be dealing with Vienna activities. It will be a challenge for people to adapt to the new situation and potentially locate some of them in Berlin. 

With the acquisition of the Dutch company Pop Vriend Seeds on 1 July 2019, KWS entered into the vegetable seed business. In contrast to the calendar year, KWS has a fiscal year from 1 July to 30 June.

Research and collaboration
The company invests an average of 17% of its annual turnover in research and development to develop new seed varieties adapted to agricultural requirements, climatic conditions and geological conditions. KWS uses various breeding methods such as cross & selection, line and hybrid breeding, digital phenotyping, genetic engineering and genome editing

References

Bibliography
 Betina Meißner, "Planting Seeds for Success," Wallstein Publishing House, Göttingen, 2007, pp. 90–91.
 Detlef Diestel, "Sugar Refinery Klein Wanzleben from Foundation to 1917/18," in Landwirtschaft und Kapitalismus, Bd. 1, Teil 2, Berlin 1979, pp. 63–90.

External links

 
 www.gabi.de

Biotechnology companies of Germany
Companies listed on the Frankfurt Stock Exchange
1856 establishments in Germany
Companies established in 1856
Plant breeding